Louis Austin (1898–1971) was an American journalist.

Louis Austin may also refer to:

Louis Daly Irving Austin (1877–1967), New Zealand pianist
Louis Frederic Austin (1852–1905), British journalist
Louis Winslow Austin (1867–1932), American physicist